Hellsongs is a three piece acoustic band from Sweden who produce covers of famous hard rock and heavy metal songs in a very different style that they call 'lounge metal'. That means old metal classics performed with clear female vocals, soft guitars and organ.

History
In 2004 the band was formed consisting of Harriet Ohlsson - lead vocals, Johan Bringhed - keyboard, vocals and Kalle - guitar, banjo and vocals. In 2005, the Swedish national heavy metal radio show Rundgång on Sveriges Radio P3 featured Hellsongs playing a cover of Iron Maiden's "Run to the Hills" live. As Rundgång became a television show, it featured a live clip of the same act.

In 2006 the band released their debut EP "Lounge" which consists of six tracks of versions of old metal classics such as "Run to the Hills", "Jump" (originally by Van Halen) and "Orgasmatron" (originally by Motörhead). The EP got positive response and Hellsongs built a reputation as a live act in Scandinavia.
 
Their first full-length album, Hymns in the Key of 666 was released in early 2008 in the Nordic countries by the label Despotz Records. The album hit the Swedish charts at 9 the first week. It was later released in the UK, Germany, Austria, Switzerland, Russia, Ukraine, Greece, Japan, Australia and New Zealand.

In 2009 Siri Bergnéhr replaced Ohlsson as the lead singer, and the EP Pieces of Heaven, a Glimpse of Hell was issued. In 2010 a second album Minor Misdemeanors came out on Tapete Records and in May the band toured in Germany.

On Nov 11, 2010, Siri Bergnéhr had a minor stroke, and the remainder of their tour dates were canceled. They played a farewell concert in their hometown of Göteborg on Mar 11, 2011, and do not plan to continue the band with the same members.

In early 2012 Hellsongs released the live recording from the show with the Göteborg Symphonics, "Long Live Lounge" and once again hit the roads, now with My Engström-Renman on vocals.
The rest of the year was spent recording a new album which was released as "These are evil times..." in 2013. The album consists of five covers and for the first time in band history five original songs. Bandleader Kalle opened the band to a different musical approach by using  drums, electric guitars and keyboards on that record. 
Autumn 2013 saw the band touring Europe with main focus on Germany.
Hellsongs are planning further touring in European countries like Netherlands or Italy, which will lead to play some summer festivals in 2014. In 2013, Karlsson reported that songs for a new album are being written. It is likely to contain original material as well as some cover versions.

"Lounge" track listing

Guest musicians
David Wertén - Double bass on "Paranoid" and "Jump"
Johannes Bergion - Cello on "Paranoid" and "Jump"
Johan Reivén - Percussion, add, guitar

"Hymns in the Key of 666" track listing

"Pieces of Heaven, a Glimpse of Hell" track listing

"Minor Misdemeanors" track listing

"These are Evil Times" track listing
 Iron Man (Original Artist: Black Sabbath)
 A Silence so loud (Original Artist: Hellsongs)
 Engel (Original Artist: Rammstein)
 Cold (Original Artist: At the Gates)
 Animal Army (Original Artist: Hellsongs)
 Eyemaster (Original Artist: Entombed)
 Equality (Original Artist: Hellsongs)
 Oh, Rosseau! (Original Artist: Hellsongs)
 Stand up & shout (Original Artist: Dio)
 Music took my Life (Original Artist: Hellsongs)

References

External links
 www.hellsongs.com
 last.fm entry

Swedish heavy metal musical groups
Tapete Records artists